Swapan Sadhan Bose, also known as  Tutu Bose (born 23 January 1948), is an Indian politician from All India Trinamool Congress who was a Member of the Parliament of India representing West Bengal in the Rajya Sabha, the upper house of the Parliament.

He is also the President of Mohun Bagan AC.  and a member of the Federation International Football Association (FIFA) Club Task Force.

He completed his B.Com and LLB at St. Xavier's College, Calcutta, University of Calcutta.

Business interests
Swapan Sadhan Bose is the owner of the cargo-handling Ripley & Co which had a turnover of 3 billion in 2008–09. In Dubai, where Bose spends more than half his time now, he runs Radio Asia Network and the Dolphin Recording Studio. The radio network — Radio Asia (AM) in Malayalam, Suno 1024 (FM) in Hindi/Urdu and Super 947 (FM) in Malayalam and Tamil — reaches out to Indians in West Asia. The interest in media is not new, though. He diversified his business interests through the Bengali newspaper Sangbad Pratidin in August 1992. In the mid-1990s, he launched the Kolkata edition of The Asian Age, which he exited towards the end of the decade by selling a 74 per cent stake to Vijay Mallya.

Political affiliation
In his early years, Bose was known to be close to the Communist Party of India (Marxist), and was said to have some business ties with late Jyoti Basu's son, Chandan Basu. It was during those times that Bose acquired a 74 per cent stake in state-owned Niramoy Polyclinic (now AMRI) along with S K Todi, also known for his Left leanings. It was given on lease to the consortium. Later, in 1996, Bose sold his stake to Emami.

Bose changed his political affiliation to the Trinamool Congress in early 2000. In 2005, he became a Member of Parliament. His son, Srinjoy Bose, took his place in the Rajya Sabha from the Trinamool Congress in 2011.

References

External links

Living people
Trinamool Congress politicians from West Bengal
University of Calcutta alumni
1948 births
St. Xavier's College, Kolkata alumni
Rajya Sabha members from West Bengal
 Journalists from West Bengal